Gangster: A Love Story is a 2006 Indian Hindi-language romantic thriller film directed by Anurag Basu. It stars Kangana Ranaut, Emraan Hashmi and Shiney Ahuja. The film is produced by Mahesh Bhatt and Mukesh Bhatt of Vishesh Films. The music and the soundtrack is composed by Pritam.

Gangster released theatrically on 28 April 2006, and proved to be a commercial success at the box office. it received positive reviews from critics, with praise for its screenplay, soundtrack, cinematography and performances of the cast, with particular praise directed towards Ranaut's performance.

At the 52nd Filmfare Awards, Gangster received 10 nominations, including Best Villain (Hashmi) and Best Male Playback Singer (Zubeen Garg for "Ya Ali"), and won Best Female Debut (Ranaut).

Plot

Simran drowns her misery in booze. Her one friend in Seoul is Aakash (Emraan Hashmi), a singer in an Indian restaurant.

Originally a bar dancer in Mumbai, India, Simran is the girlfriend of a notorious gangster, Daya (Shiney Ahuja). 5 years ago, Daya's boss Khan (Gulshan Grover) ordered him to give Simran up. When Khan threatened Simran, Daya turned on him and Khan cut Daya loose from his gang.

She and Daya were forced to flee to Seoul. They took a small boy named Bittu with them. After an encounter with the Mumbai police, Bittu was killed, causing a strain in the couple's relationship and pushing Simran toward alcoholism. Leaving Simran alone in Seoul, Daya went to work in Mauritius and then Dubai.

Aakash tells Simran that he cares for her despite her past, and their relationship gradually develops from friendship to love. Daya, who is still in Dubai, suddenly comes to Seoul. When he learns of Simran's affair with Aakash, he attacks and severely beats him in a fit of rage and jealousy. Daya then professes his love for her and promises to reform and fulfill her dreams of a normal life; he also tells her that if she truly loves Aakash he will not hold her back. Before Simran can respond, the police arrive in pursuit of Daya and Simran. The two flee.

Daya gives up murdering innocents and begins working odd jobs, admitting to Simran that he has found peace in doing honest work. He says that he would like to return to his village in India with her, so that they might live there peacefully. To do so he would have to perform one last crime: fake passports for him and Simran.

Simran, who is longing for Aakash, soon discovers that she is pregnant with his child. When she tells Aakash, he meets her and tells her he would like to marry her, but they will never find peace as long as Daya is at large. He says that for the sake of their unborn child, Daya must be turned in to the police and only Simran can do this. Simran, who is still emotionally attached to Daya, refuses.

Meanwhile, Daya, who has gone to forge passports for himself and Simran, is intercepted by Khan, who reminds Daya of what had occurred between them years before and says that he intends to make an example of Daya for abandoning the gang. Khan and his men severely beat and wound Daya, who is eventually able to fight back and kills Khan. He then calls Simran, warning her that the police are after them and asking her to meet him outside a Seoul train station that night.

Simran arrives at the appointed time to find Daya badly injured from his fight with Khan. He manages to crawl to Simran and takes out a box of sindoor for her. But just as he reaches and embraces her, they are surrounded by police cars. Daya realises that Simran informed the police; heartbroken and screaming, he is hauled away. Simran remains at the station until morning and then goes to meet Aakash, whom she finds is not at home. She is soon informed that he is at the Indian embassy.

When she reaches the embassy, she enters a room full of reporters and sees a large screen showing a video of her telling Aakash about her relationship with Daya. She is thunderstruck when she sees that the one addressing the media is none other than Aakash, who is actually an undercover Indian detective hired to capture Daya. Realizing that Aakash befriended and wooed her solely to discover Daya's whereabouts, she explodes in fury in front of the media; Aakash holds her back and slaps her across the face. He tells her that he never cared for her and that his involvement with her was only a part of his duty to end organised crime and bring justice to his country. Enraged, Simran tries to attack him, but she is stopped by security. While she is being hauled away, she yells that to spread justice Aakash and his colleagues have done her an injustice and that Daya, who has never betrayed anyone, is not the gangster but Aakash and his men are. She reminds Aakash that he has betrayed the woman who is carrying his child and that he will regret his actions.

Daya, who has been arrested and taken to jail, sends Simran a letter saying that he does not blame her for what she did and that she is the one who has been betrayed; he admits that he has done many cruel and bad things but that, thanks to her, he now knows what it is like to live an honest life. He encloses her fake passport and, stating his love for her, writes that he would feel better knowing that she is living safely in India. After reading Daya's letter, Simran is left pained and guilty.

Months later, Daya admits and pleads guilty to his crimes. He is tried and sentenced to death. Simran goes to meet him in prison and asks him to forgive her; they share an emotional goodbye. She later goes to Aakash's residence and, forcefully entering his house with a gun, shoots and fatally injures him. Before he lapses into unconsciousness, Aakash shoots her in the shoulder and they are found and taken to a hospital.

Aakash dies in the hospital while Simran is transferred to the I.C.U. At dawn she escapes to the roof, where she commits suicide by jumping off the roof. At the same time, Daya is hanged. Simran is shown falling through the air. Before she reaches the ground we see her standing in a meadow and gazing at Daya, who is holding Bittu. Smiling, they hold out their arms to her; she happily runs toward them, and they embrace in heaven.

Cast
 Kangana Ranaut as Simran
 Emraan Hashmi  as Akash Kapadia
Shiney Ahuja as Daya Shankar 
 Gulshan Grover as Khan
 Hitanshu Lodhia as Bittu
 Vicky Ahuja as Usman
 Zubeen Garg (special appearance in song "Ya Ali")
 Pritam as himself (special appearance in song "Bheegi Bheegi")

Pakistani cricketer Shoaib Akhtar was initially offered the role of Daya, but he turned it down saying, "Cricket is not only my profession but my obsession as well".

Tollywood actress Koel Mallick was also initially offered the role of Simran, but she rejected it due to her discomfort towards the intimate and bold scenes in the script.

Critical reception
Gangster received positive reviews from critics, with praise for its screenplay, soundtrack and performances of the cast, with particular praise directed towards Ranaut's performance. Raja Sen of Rediff awarded the film 3.5 stars (out of 5) and stated that ‘‘Ranaut is a remarkable find, the actress comes across with great conviction. Hers is the pivotal character and an extremely difficult role to essay, but she manages it well. Ranaut's nuances [of an alcoholic dancer] are disconcertingly realistic’’. Praising Hashmi's performance he further added, ‘‘His character is an understated one, and he manages to keep it that way. There is no unnecessary bluster or melodrama, and he does a pretty believable job. There is something lazy about his acting, by which I mean he makes the job look easy’’.

Awards and nominations

Soundtrack

Track list

The soundtrack is composed by Pritam. The complete album consisted of five original tracks and four remixes. Saregama brought the music rights of the Film. The song "Bheegi Bheegi" is a modern re-creation of the song "Prithibi Ta Naki" by Moheener Ghoraguli. Singer Zubeen Garg had first sung "Tu Hi Meri Shab hai" but later in the released version its dubbed by KK. "Ya Ali" is a rip-off of the Kuwaiti pop song "Ya Ghali" by the Kuwaiti band Guitara. Palestinian Bollywood blogger, Ahmad Rashad Arafa, who has familial ties to Kuwait, called "Ya Ali" a "Sufi-esque dud that doesn't hold a candle to the original Kuwaiti song."

Reception
The soundtrack was popular upon release with songs like "Ya Ali", "Tu Hi Meri Shab Hai" & "Bheegi Bheegi" topping the charts and hence were declared chartbusters within a week of their release. Gangster became the fifth best-selling album of 2006 in India selling over 16,00,000 units.
Aakash Gandhi from Planet Bollywood rated the album 7.5/10 and wrote, "All in all, I would say that Gangster is a sure winner. It has mass appeal; it has a flavorful array of tunes to sample, and it features some fresh singers."

References
Gangster Movie's Music

External links
 
 

2006 films
2006 crime drama films
Indian gangster films
2000s Hindi-language films
Films shot in South Korea
Indian romantic thriller films
Films featuring songs by Pritam
Films set in South Korea
Hindi films remade in other languages
Indian crime drama films
2000s romantic thriller films
Films directed by Anurag Basu